
Yongning ( unless otherwise noted) may refer to:

Places in China
Yongning County, Ningxia
Yongning District (邕宁区), Nanning, Guangxi

Subdistricts
Yongning Subdistrict, Guangzhou, in Zengcheng District, Guangzhou, Guangdong
Yongning Subdistrict, Nanjing, in Pukou District, Nanjing, Jiangsu
Yongning Subdistrict, Yitong County, in Yitong County, Jilin
Yongning Subdistrict, Luzhou, in Naxi District, Luzhou, Sichuan

Towns
Yongning, Beijing, in Yanqing District, Beijing
Yongning, Fujian, in Shishi, Fujian
Yongning, Hui County, in Hui County, Gansu
Yongning, Zhuanglang County, in Zhuanglang County, Gansu
Yongning, Yangchun, in Yangchun, Guangdong
Yongning, Guizhou, in Guanling Buyei and Miao Autonomous County, Guizhou
Yongning, Jiangxi, in Tonggu County, Jiangxi
Yongning, Liaoning, in Wafangdian, Liaoning
Yongning, Shaanxi, in Zhidan County, Shaanxi
Yongning, Cangxi County, in Cangxi County, Sichuan
Yongning, Wenjiang District, in Wenjiang District, Chengdu, Sichuan
Yongning, Xinjiang, in Yanqi Hui Autonomous County, Xinjiang

Townships
Yongning Township, Chengdu, in Jianyang, Sichuan
Yongning Township, Wanyuan, in Wanyuan, Sichuan
Yongning Township, Honghe Prefecture, in Luxi County, Yunnan
Yongning Township, Ninglang County, in Ninglang Yi Autonomous County, Yunnan
Yongning, Ankang

Historical eras
Yongning (120–121), era name used by Emperor An of Han
Yongning (301–302), era name used by Emperor Hui of Jin
Yongning (350–351), era name used by Shi Zhi, emperor of Later Zhao

See also
Yongning Station, a station on the Tucheng Line of the Taipei Rapid Transit System in Taipei, Taiwan